Juary Martinho Soares (born 20 February 1992) is a Bissau-Guinean footballer who plays as a defender. He plays for Portuguese Liga 3 side Amora.

Club career
On 13 January 2013, Juary made his debut with Sporting B in a 2012–13 Segunda Liga match against Oliveirense.

After six years in the Portuguese second and third levels, split by a year in Macau with Benfica de Macau in 2014–15, Juary moved to France, joining Championnat National side Créteil in the summer of 2020.

International career
Juary Soares was born in Guinea-Bissau, but raised in Portugal. He was called up by the Guinea Bissau national football team for their 2017 Africa Cup of Nations qualification matches against Kenya, and made his debut in a 1-0 win. That qualification campaign was for the first time  successful and at the Africa Cup Nations debut match for Guinea-Bissau, Juary Soares scored the equalising goal in stoppage time against host country Gabon.

International goals

Scores and results list Guinea-Bissau's goal tally first.

References

External links 
 
 

1992 births
Living people
Sportspeople from Bissau
Bissau-Guinean footballers
Guinea-Bissau international footballers
Bissau-Guinean expatriate footballers
Bissau-Guinean expatriate sportspeople in Portugal
Bissau-Guinean expatriate sportspeople in France
Expatriate footballers in Portugal
Expatriate footballers in France
Bissau-Guinean expatriate sportspeople in Macau
Expatriate footballers in Macau
Sporting CP footballers
Sporting CP B players
Association football defenders
Sertanense F.C. players
S.L. Benfica de Macau players
C.D. Mafra players
US Créteil-Lusitanos players
Amora F.C. players
Campeonato de Portugal (league) players
Liga Portugal 2 players
Championnat National players
2017 Africa Cup of Nations players
2019 Africa Cup of Nations players